Cyrtodactylus tanahjampea,  also known as the Tanahjampea bent-toed gecko, is a species of gecko endemic to Tanah Jampea Island in Indonesia.

References

Cyrtodactylus
Reptiles described in 2018
Endemic fauna of Indonesia
Reptiles of Indonesia